The Solovki special camp (later the Solovki special prison), was set up in 1923 on the Solovetsky Islands in the White Sea as a remote and inaccessible place of detention, primarily intended for socialist opponents of Soviet Russia's new Bolshevik regime. The first book on the Gulag, namely, In the Claws of the GPU (1934) by Francišak Aljachnovič, described the Solovki prison camp.

At first, the Anarchists, Mensheviks and Socialist Revolutionaries enjoyed a special status there and were not made to work. Gradually, prisoners from the old regime (priests, gentry, and White Army officers) joined them and the guards and the ordinary criminals worked together to keep the "politicals" in order.

This was the nucleus from which the entire Gulag grew, thanks to its proximity to the first great construction project of the Five-Year Plans, the White Sea–Baltic Canal.

In one way, Solovki and the White Sea Canal broke a basic rule of the Gulag: they were both far too close to the border. This facilitated a number of daring escapes in the 1920s; as war loomed in the late 1930s it led to the closure of the Solovki special prison. Its several thousand inmates were transferred elsewhere, or shot on the mainland and on Solovki.

The "mother of the Gulag"

Aleksandr Solzhenitsyn called Solovki the "mother of the GULAG".

From monastery to concentration camp

Historically, the Solovetsky Islands were the location of the famous Russian Orthodox Solovetsky Monastery complex. It was a centre of economic activity with over three hundred monks, and also a forepost of Russian naval power in the North, repelling foreign attacks during the Time of Troubles, the Crimean War, and the Russian Civil War.  In the autumn of 1922 the process of transitioning from a monastery to concentration camp began.
All wooden buildings were burned, and many of the monks were murdered, including the Igumen. The remaining monks were sent to forced labour camps in central Russia.

The unpublished decree of 3 November 1923 led to the conversion of the monastery buildings into the Solovki "special" camp: the Solovetsky Lager Osobogo Naznachenia or SLON in Russian (the acronym is a play on the Russian word for elephant). One of the first "forced labor camps", Solovki served as a prototype for the Gulag as a whole. In early 1924, it was sometimes given a double name, Severnye (Solovetskiye) Lagerya OGPU (Northern (Solovki) camps of OGPU).

Its remote situation made escape almost impossible and in Tsarist times the monastery had been used, on occasion, as a political prison by the Russian imperial administration. The treatment of the prisoners in the Soviet-era camp attracted much criticism in Western Europe and the United States after a book came out in England, An Island Hell, by S. A. Malsagoff. This book appeared soon after a Solovki prisoner, who secretly knew how to speak English, managed to escape from Kem on an English freight vessel. After a thorough clean-up, the Soviet government sent the proletarian writer Maxim Gorky there in an attempt to counter this negative publicity. He wrote a very favourable essay, which praised the beauty of nature on the islands, but some authors believe he understood the real conditions he was witnessing.

The Baltic-White Sea Canal 

The exact number of prisoners sent to Solovki from 1923 to the closure of its penitentiary facilities in 1939 is unknown. Estimates range between tens and hundreds of thousands.

In 1923, Soloviki contained "no more than 3,000" prisoners; by 1930, the number had jumped to "about 50,000", with another 30,000 held on the mainland at the nearest railhead of Kem. In the early 1930s, many of the prisoners from the camp worked on the notorious White Sea – Baltic Canal, one of a succession of grandiose schemes devised by Stalin.

A Special Prison, 1936–1939
In 1936, the Solovki camp was renamed a "special" prison (STON, an acronym that reads "Groan" in Russian) and from then until its closure in 1939 it served as a holding area for many prisoners subsequently executed, there or on the mainland, during the Great Terror of 1937–1938.

Until documents confirming their execution were found in 1996, it was long thought that a transport of over one thousand prisoners, a quota for "1st category arrests" (executions), died from drowning after the barges on which they were travelling were deliberately sunk in the White Sea. It is now known that they were shot on the mainland in late October and early November 1937; subsequent quotas for execution came too late in the year to sail across the White Sea and were shot on the islands, near Sekirnaya Hill.

All but five of the 1,116 prisoners sent from Solovki across the White Sea on 27 October 1937 were executed by NKVD Captain and senior executioner Mikhail Matveyev at Sandarmokh between that date and 10 November 1937, when he reported his task complete. Among those killed were 289 members of the Ukrainian intelligentsia, the Executed Renaissance.

A further transport was prepared to sail to the mainland for execution, but it was too late in the year to cross the frozen sea. Instead, between 200 and 300 prisoners were shot on Solovki itself, near the Sekirnaya Hill. One of the many victims was Yelizaveta Katz, an engineer, who was 8 months pregnant. She was due to be shot with the others on 17 February 1938, but was allowed to give birth, then shot three months later on 16 May, aged 28.

In 1939, the prison was closed. It was situated too close to the border with Finland, and the Second World War was imminent. The buildings were transformed into a naval base and a cadet corps was deployed there. (One of its students was the future author Valentin Pikul.)

World Heritage and a disputed legacy 

In 1989, a permanent exhibition, "The Solovki special camp", was added to the museum on the islands, the first anywhere in the USSR to be devoted to the Gulag. In June of that year, the first Days of Remembrance for Victims of Political Repression were held on the islands; in subsequent years this event would take place in August.

The Orthodox Church reestablished the monastery in 1992, and that year the ensemble was added to UNESCO's World Heritage List.

In 2015, human rights activists expressed disquiet that the authorities were "gradually removing all traces of the labor camp". In January 2016 the Gulag section in the Solovki Museum was closed by its new director, Vladimir Shutov who, as Archimandrite Porfiry, was head of the monastery.

In August 2017, the local authorities asked police to investigate the 29th annual Days of Remembrance as an "unauthorised" gathering. Early in 2018, a court in the Arkhangelsk Region heard an unsuccessful plea by Archimandrite Porfiry to annul a contract concluded in 2011 with the head of the now disbanded Gulag section of the museum and evict its former head, Olga Bochkaryova, and her daughter from their two-room apartment.

The author of several books about Solovki, Yury Brodsky, was accused by an Orthodox website of displaying "religious hatred" in his latest publication.

Notable prisoners 

Members of the intelligentsia, representing both Tsarist Russia and the post-revolutionary USSR, were prominent among the prisoners on Solovki.

The 1920s
In the 1920s many of those sent to Solovki were released, but often arrested and imprisoned (or exiled) a second time.

 Frantsishak Alyakhnovich, Belarusian writer, a citizen of interwar Poland, who wrote the first book-length witness-account about Gulag, titled, In the Claws of the GPU; imprisoned 1927–1933, in 1933 exchanged with Poland for Branislaw Tarashkyevich.
 Vladimir Artemyev, inventor: imprisoned 1923–1925
 Osip Braz, Russian-Jewish realist painter: imprisoned 1924–1926
 Boris Shiriaev writer, author of La veilleuse de Solovki - 1889 - 1959 imprisoned in 1923
 Leonid Feodorov, Bishop and Exarch of the Russian Greek Catholic Church: imprisoned 1923–1929
 Konstantine Gamsakhurdia, Georgian writer: imprisoned mid-1920s
 G.J.Gordon, historian
 Yuri Bezsonov, a cavalry commander in the Dikaya Divisia, one of the very few people, who succeeded in escaping the camp
 , poet: sent to Solovki (?) in 1929
 Jamo bey Hajinski, State Controller and Minister of Transportation, Postal Service and Telegraph of Azerbaijan Democratic Republic: imprisoned 1925–1928
 Archimandrite , Professor of the Moscow Theological Academy: imprisoned 1924–1929
 , Professor of the Moscow Theological Academy: imprisoned 1925-1927
 , historian and ethnographer: imprisoned 1925–1928, shot at Sandarmokh on 8 January 1938, aged 61

The First Five-Year Plan, 1928–1932

Naftaly Frenkel was a prisoner on Solovki who became a leading cadre in the security services during the First Five-Year Plan.

Arrested by the OGPU in 1923, he was sentenced to ten years imprisonment and sent to Solovki. There his sentence was reduced and in 1927, he was released and appointed head of production at SLON before being sent as representative of the camp to Moscow in 1929. Soon he was in charge of production throughout the Gulag and oversaw work on the White Sea Canal. His activities in the Gulag paralleled the forced industrialisation and collectivisation of agriculture throughout the Soviet Union.

The mass shooting on Solovki in 1929 described by Dmitry Sergeyevich Likhachov (it forms a key episode in Marina Goldovskaya's 1987 film, Solovki Power) was a sign of the harshening regime.

 Nikolai Antsiferov, historian: imprisoned 1929–1933
 Academician Dmitry Likhachov, philologist: imprisoned 1928–1931, then worked on White Sea Canal until 1932
 Vladimir V. Tchernavin, ichthyologist: imprisoned 1931, then transferred to Kem. From Kem he escaped to the West and wrote about his experiences in his book, I Speak for the Silent Prisoners of the Soviets.
 Vladimir N. Beneshevich, historian, paleographer: imprisoned 1928–1933
 , writer: imprisoned 1928–1929, 1931–1936
 Mirjaqip Dulatuli, Kazakh writer: imprisoned 1928–1935 (died in Solovki)
 Klym Polishchuk, Ukrainian journalist, poet and writer sentenced for 10 years in 1929, executed in 1937
 Vera Baltz, Russian soil scientist, sentenced for 5 years in 1930, released early in 1933 on account of age
 Evgenia Iaroslavskaia-Markon, Russian journalist and anarchist, sentenced for 3 years in 1930, executed in 1931.

The mid- to late 1930s
Many of those on Solovki later in the 1930s fell victim to Stalin's Great Purge and were shot, either in autumn 1937 at Sandarmokh or on Solovki in February 1938.

 , lawyer and acrivist of the Smenovekhovtsy, a descendant of Decembrist Pavel Sergeyevich Bobrishchev-Pushkin: imprisoned 1934–1937, shot at Sandarmokh on 27 October 1937, aged 61
 Pavel Florensky, priest, scientist, encyclopaedist: imprisoned 1934–1937, shot at unknown location 
 Nariman bey Narimanbeyov, State Controller of Azerbaijan Democratic Republic (1918-1920): died on Solovki in 1937, aged 48 (shot?)
 Karlo Štajner, a Yugoslavian communist: imprisoned 1937–1939
 , Ukrainian poet: imprisoned 1937, shot at Sandarmokh on 3 November 1937, aged 33
 Hamid bey Shahtakhtinski, Minister of Education and Religious Affairs of Azerbaijan Democratic Republic (1918–1920): imprisoned 1941–1944 when he died.

Camp commanders 

 October 13, 1923 to November 13, 1925 – Alexander Nogtev
 November 13, 1925  to May 20, 1929 – Fedor Eichmans
 May 20, 1929 to May 19, 1930 ‌– Alexander Nogtev
 May 19, 1930 to September 25, 1931 – Andrei Ivanchenko
 September 25, 1931 to November 6, 1931 – K. Y. Dukis (acting)
 November 6-16, 1931 – E. I. Senkevich
 November 16, 1931 to January 1, 1932 the camp was closed due to the organization of the Belbaltlag on its base
 January 1932 to March 1933 – E. I. Senkevich
 August 27, 1932 – P. A. Boyar (mentioned as temporarily acting chief)
 January 28, 1933 to no later than August 13, 1933 (mentioned) – Yakov Bukhband
 October 8, 1933 – Levlev (mentioned as temporary acting chief)
 December 4, 1933 – the camp as an independent unit is closed

The prison on Solovki in art and literature

Émigré and samizdat literature, 1926-1974
  The first memoir about Solovki was by S.A. Malsagoff, a North Caucasian prisoner, who escaped after a year on the islands.
 
  Tchernavin was a prisoner in the camp in the early 1930s. He described his experiences there in his book, published after his escape abroad.
  Ivan Ponyrov, the poet also known as "Ivan the Homeless", suggests to Woland (a German name for Satan) that Immanuel Kant should be sent to Solovki as punishment for his attempts to prove the existence of God. Woland replies

Thats just the place for him! I told him so that day at breakfast...[However] It is impossible to send him to Solovki for the simple reason that he has resided for the past hundred-odd years in places considerably more remote than Solovki, and, I assure you, it is quite impossible to get him out of there.

 The fictional town of Solovets in the Strugatsky brothers' popular Monday Begins on Saturday (1965) is an allusion to the Solovetsky Monastery.
  Solzhenitsyn spends an entire chapter of Volume 2 discussing the development of Solovki and conditions there during the early years of the Soviet regime.
 Boris Shirayev, author of La veilleuse de Solovki described the birth of the first gulag in 1923, the date when he was imprisoned.
He described the daily routine and the socio-cultural multitude of the prisoners.

Perestroika and Glasnost, 1985-1991 
 Marina Goldovskaya's 1988 documentary film The Solovki Regime («Власть Соловецкая») tells the story of the first, permanent camp in Soviet Russia, from its founding in 1923 to the closure of the prison in 1939. It includes  interviews with former prisoners, among them mediaevalist Dmitry Likhachyov, writer Oleg Volkov and long-term Gulag inmate Olga Adamova-Sliozberg (one of the four named sources in Solzhenitsyn's Gulag Archipelago, the rest were anonymous until 1994).
  Abridged version of the 1989 Soviet original («Доднесь тяготеет. т. 1. Записки Вашей современницы»). Includes two key memoirs describing the early and final stages of the camp's existence (see Memoirs, below).
 Yugoslav communist Karlo Štajner served a part of his sentence on Solovki. He recounts his experiences there in 7,000 days in Siberia (English edn. 1989).

Footnotes

Further reading (in order of publication)

Memoirs
 
 Tchernavin, Vladimir V. (1935), I Speak for the Silent: Prisoners of the Soviets. Boston: Hale, Cushman, and Flint.
  Excerpt from memoir written in 1970s by a Left Social-Revolutionary (tr. John Crowfoot)
  Excerpt from memoir written in 1940s and 1950s by a repentant non-Party communist (translated by Sally Laird)
 Sliozberg, Olga Adamova (2011), My Journey: How one woman survived Stalin's Gulag, Northwestern University Press: Evanston, Ill. (The full unabridged memoir, translated by Katharine Gratwick Baker.)

Novels

Studies
 
 Michael Jakobson (1993), Origins of the GULAG: The Soviet Prison Camp System, 1917–1934. Lexington, KY: University Press of Kentucky.
 Galina Mikhaĭlovna Ivanova, Carol Apollonio Flath, and Donald J. Raleigh (2000), Labor Camp Socialism: The Gulag in the Soviet Totalitarian System. New York: M.E. Sharpe.
 
 Roy P. Robson (2004), Solovki: The Story of Russia Told Through its Most Remarkable Islands. Cambridge, MA: Yale University Press.
 Shubin, Daniel H. Monastery Prisons,

External links
 
 A. Razumov, "The Solovki transports, 1937-1938", Returning the Names website 
 Forced Labor Camps, Blinken Open Society Archives
 The Dmitriev Affair website 

Camps of the Gulag
Russian Civil War
Buildings and structures in Arkhangelsk Oblast
Prisons in the Soviet Union
Soviet Union
1923 establishments in the Soviet Union
Massacres in the Soviet Union
Political repression in the Soviet Union
NKVD
Politicides
Solovetsky Islands
Prison islands